Danilo III  may refer to:

 Danilo III (patriarch)
 Danilo III of Montenegro

See also
 Danilo I (disambiguation)
 Danilo II (disambiguation)